Rabbi Isaac ben Mordecai of Regensburg (Hebrew: יצחק בן מרדכי מרגנסבורג) also known by his acronym Ribam (Rabbi Isaac Ben Mordecai) was a 12th century German Tosafist.

Biography 
Born in Prague, Bohemia, in his early years, Rabbi Isaac studied in Regensburg under Rabbeinu Tam and Isaac ben Asher ha-Levi. In the following years, he served as the head of the city's bet din. He compiled tosafot to most tractates of the Talmud. A large number of his tosafot are on the tractate Bava Batra, which are included in the first printed edition of the Talmud. He also known to have written tosafot on tractates Pesaḥim, Mo'ed Katan, Bava Kamma, Shabbat, Ketubbot, Gittin, Sotah, Nazir, and Bava Meẓia. In his later life, Rabbi Isaac became embroiled in a controversy  with Eliezer ben Nathan of Mainz, who criticized several of Rabbi Isaac's statements and in his reply, Rabbi Isaac is said to have treated him with great respect. Among his pupils where Ephraim ben Isaac of Regensburg.

References 

12th-century German rabbis
Tosafists